NAD X Road, or NAD Kotha Road, is one of the major junctions and commercial centers in Visakhapatnam, India. It is named for the Naval Armament Depot. The Naval Armament Depot and (NSTL) Naval Science and Technological Laboratories is located here.

Commerce

NAD X Road is a busy commercial hub in Visakhapatnam. The NAD X Road Bus Stand, termed the "floating population", attracts migrants from the rest of the country. It has many shops catering to the needs of its residents. Major apparel stores including Raymond, Reebok, and Nike have branches here. Major automobile companies like Maruti and Hero Honda hold potential outlets here.

Transport
NAD X Road is well connected within Visakhapatnam. The APSRTC has bus routes to areas such as Gajuwaka, Simhachalam, Asilmetta, Pendurthi, Maddilapalem and city bus stop for long service Towards Hyderabad , Chennai , Bangalore, Vijayawada , Thirupathi, Nellore , Kadapa , Kurnool , Khammam , Narasapuram , Bhimavaram, Tanuku , Rajahmundry , Kakinada , Amalapuram, Srikakulam , palasa and some other orrisa towns, etc.  via NAD X Road. Additional buses are available from the Simhachalam bus depot. Other than Road Transport Corporation, AP., Private autorickshaws and taxi conveyances are also available. Due to the educational and training institutions, traffic congestion is common at NAD X Road in the peak timings of morning , evening and night. A flyover is constructing here to reduce the traffic.

APSRTC routes

Education
NAD X Road is home to many educational institutions, commercial coaching and training centers.

References

Neighbourhoods in Visakhapatnam
Roads in Visakhapatnam